Edward Bishop may refer to:

Edward Bishop (Salem witch trials), sawyer involved in the Salem witch trials of 1692
Edward Bishop, Baron Bishopston (1920–1984), British Labour Party politician
Edward Bishop (cricketer) (1872–1943), Australian cricketer
Edward Bishop (mayor) (1811–1887), 6th Mayor of Christchurch, New Zealand
Edward Bishop (rugby union) (1864–1919), Wales international rugby union player
Edward Bishop (EastEnders), a fictional character
Ed Bishop (1932–2005), American actor
Eddie Bishop (born 1961), English footballer
Ted Bishop, Canadian actor and author
Ted Bishop (golfer) (1913–1986), American golfer
Teddy Bishop (born 1996), English footballer

See also
Edward Bishopp (disambiguation)
Edward Bishop Dudley (1789–1855), Whig governor of North Carolina
Edward Bishop Elliott (1793–1875), English theologian